Rehali may refer to:

Rehali, Maharashtra, Gondia district, Maharashtra, India
Rehali, Madhya Pradesh, Shajapur district, Madhya Pradesh, India